60 may refer to: 
 60 (number)
 one of the years 60 BC, AD 60, 1960, 2060
 Neodymium, the 60th element
 <, the ASCII character with code 60
 Base 60 (sexagesimal, sexagenary)
 "Sixty", a song by Karma to Burn from the album Mountain Czar, 2016